Busiri may refer to:

 Al-Busiri, Sanhaji Berber Sufi poet belonging
 Giovanni Battista Busiri (1698–1757), Italian painter
 Busiri Suryowinoto, governor of Irian Jaya

See also
 Busiris (disambiguation)